Jo So-ang (조소앙, 30 April 1887 – 10 September 1958) was a politician and an educator in Korea under Japanese rule. He participated in the Korean independence movement.

He participated in drawing up a draft of the proclamation of the independence of Korea in 1918 while he was studying in Japan, and after 1919, worked for the Provisional Government of the Republic of Korea as the secretary of the provisional government and head of the Korean Independence Party. He also organized the society of policies on current affairs with Kim Gu and Yeo Unhyeong, contributing to establish the theories on diplomacy of the provisional government. In the political scene of liberated Korea, he was one of the right politicians, who stuck to the legitimacy of the Provisional Government of the Republic of Korea. In 1948, he visited Pyongyang to attend the joint conference of leaders of parties and social groups in the entire nation with Kim Gu and Kim Gyusik, which was turned out to be a failure. He abandoned his direction for North-South Korea's cooperation, leading to one-sided establishment of Republic of Korea in favor.

He ran for a representative of the national assembly and was elected in 1950. In the same year when the Korean war broke out, he was abducted and taken to North Korea.

Role in the Independence Movement

Diplomatic Activity
Jo So-ang served roles in the national government, the political structure of the Provisional Government, and in public relations. The Provisional Government of the Republic of Korea was established on April 13, 1919, following the March 1st movement. The interim government resisted Japan's colonial rule of Korea and supported the Korean independence movement. In the midst of dividing political alliances, Jo So-ang remained loyal to the Provisional Government of the Republic of Korea and was elected as their secretary and diplomatic correspondent. Making him in charge of the interim government's remittances, propaganda, and public relations work. In May 1919, Jo traveled to Europe in order to attend the International Socialist Conference to appeal international support and recognition for South Korea's independence movement. In March 1921, after attending the Communist Party Congress in Moscow, Russia, he returned to Beijing with critical views on communism. Jo would incorporate his views and experience with communism when writing his political theories and teachings.

Legislative Activity
In 1930, based on his “Three Principles of the Equality” Jo So-ang wrote up a draft establishing what is renowned as a national and social democracy. He argued that in order to achieve social democracy, equality between individuals, equality between ethnicities, as well as the equality between nations must be attained. Following this principle, he suggested that to acquire equality amongst individuals it must be through immediate political equality such as free and equal elections. Next, in his theory, he advocated for the equality between ethnicities. Equality between ethnicities would be achieved through equal economic developments and equal educational opportunities. For the betterment of the nation as a whole, Jo so-ang presumed that the political system should be based on a parliamentary democracy in which the execution of the assimilation of lands, production of facilities/institutions, along with a mandated educational regime should be held at the expense of the socio-economic system. In 1941, not long after the “Three Equality Principles” was accepted by the Korean Provisional Government, the theory became known as the “Fundamental Governing of National Reconstruction”. Not only did his theories guide the Korean Independence Party during the occupation, but also served as the main foundations of legislation for the country post-liberation.

1887 births
1958 deaths
Hongik Ingan
Korean politicians
Liberalism in South Korea
Members of the National Assembly (South Korea)
Haman Jo clan
Three Principles of the People